In 2006 IF Elfsborg, the Swedish football club located in Borås, won their first national title since 1961, thanks to a dramatic finish to the season, where Elfsborg hit top form at the end of the year, sealing the title thanks to Joakim Sjöhage's goal against Djurgården. When Djurgården's claim for a penalty was waved off in stoppage time, Elfsborg overhauled AIK by a single point.

Squad

Goalkeepers
  Johan Wiland
  Abbas Hassan
  Nicholas Sharro

Defenders
  Johan Sjöberg
  Martin Andersson
  Daniel Mobaeck
  Jon Jönsson
  Jesper Arvidsson
  Markus Falk Olander
  Andreas Augustsson

Midfielders
  Johan Karlsson
  Jari Ilola
  Anders Svensson
  Samuel Holmén
  Magnus Samuelsson
  Sebastian Göransson
  Emir Bajrami
  Léandre Griffit
  Stefan Ishizaki
  Elmin Kurbeqović
  Daniel Eres

Attackers
  Mathias Svensson
  Joakim Sjöhage
  Daniel Alexandersson
  Denni Avdić

Allsvenskan

Matches

 Elfsborg-IFK Göteborg 1-1
 1-0 Samuel Holmén 
 1-1 Karl Svensson 
 Öster-Elfsborg 3-4
 0-1 Stefan Ishizaki 
 1-1 Helgi Daníelsson 
 1-2 Mathias Svensson 
 2-2 Marco da Silva 
 2-3 Samuel Holmén 
 3-3 Tomas Backman 
 3-4 Anders Svensson 
 Halmstad-Elfsborg 0-1
 0-1 Andreas Augustsson 
 Elfsborg-Kalmar FF 1-0
 1-0 Stefan Ishizaki 
 Elfsborg-Häcken 2-2
 0-1 Hans Berggren 
 1-1 Anders Svensson 
 1-2 Hans Berggren 
 2-2 Mathias Svensson 
 Örgryte-Elfsborg 0-2
 0-1 Joakim Sjöhage 
 0-2 Joakim Sjöhage 
 AIK-Elfsborg 2-2
 1-0 Markus Jonsson 
 2-0 Dulee Johnson 
 2-1 Anders Svensson 
 2-2 Daniel Alexandersson 
 Elfsborg-Gefle 0-1
 0-1 Yannick Bapupa 
 Elfsborg-Helsingborg 0-0
 Djurgården-Elfsborg 1-1
 1-0 Abgar Barsom 
 1-1 Andreas Augustsson 
 GAIS-Elfsborg 0-3
 0-1 Samuel Holmén 
 0-2 Jon Jönsson 
 0-3 Joakim Sjöhage 
 Elfsborg-Malmö FF 4-2
 0-1 Júnior 
 1-1 Anders Svensson 
 1-2 Júnior 
 2-2 Anders Svensson 
 3-2 Daniel Alexandersson 
 4-2 Samuel Holmén 
 Malmö FF-Elfsborg 1-1
 1-0 Daniel Andersson 
 1-1 Anders Svensson 
 Elfsborg-Halmstad 3-0
 1-0 Jon Jönsson 
 2-0 Daniel Alexandersson 
 3-0 Mathias Svensson 
 IFK Göteborg-Elfsborg 1-1
 0-1 Stefan Ishizaki 
 1-1 Gustaf Svensson 
 Elfsborg-AIK 1-1
 1-0 Andreas Augustsson 
 1-1 Daniel Mendes 
 Gefle-Elfsborg 1-1
 0-1 Anders Svensson 
 1-1 Johan Claesson 
 Häcken-Elfsborg 1-4
 0-1 Mathias Svensson 
 1-1 Dioh Williams 
 1-2 Mathias Svensson 
 1-3 Jon Jönsson 
 1-4 own goal 
 Elfsborg-Örgryte 2-0
 1-0 Stefan Ishizaki 
 2-0 Daniel Alexandersson 
 Elfsborg-Öster 0-0
 Kalmar FF-Elfsborg 0-1
 0-1 Jon Jönsson 
 Elfsborg-GAIS 1-0
 1-0 Samuel Holmén 
 Helsingborg-Elfsborg 1-1
 0-1 Mathias Svensson 
 1-1 Olivier Karekezi 
 Elfsborg-Djurgården 1-0
 1-0 Joakim Sjöhage

Topscorers
  Anders Svensson 7
  Samuel Holmén 5
  Stefan Ishizaki 4
  Mathias Svensson 4
  Jon Jönsson 4
  Daniel Alexandersson 4

Sources
  IF Elfsborg -- FootballSquads

IF Elfsborg seasons
Elfsborg
Swedish football championship-winning seasons